Marcos Antonio Almeida Silva (born 14 January 1991), commonly known as Marcão, is a Brazilian professional footballer who plays as a defensive midfielder for V.League 1 club Hanoi FC.

Club career
Marcão started his career playing with Nacional. He made his professional debut during the 2012 season.

References

External links

1991 births
Living people
Sportspeople from Bahia
Brazilian footballers
Association football midfielders
Campeonato Brasileiro Série A players
Campeonato Brasileiro Série B players
Campeonato Brasileiro Série C players
Campeonato Brasileiro Série D players
UAE Pro League players
V.League 1 players
Nacional Esporte Clube (MG) players
Araxá Esporte Clube players
Boa Esporte Clube players
Criciúma Esporte Clube players
Clube Atlético Linense players
Grêmio Esportivo Brasil players
Botafogo Futebol Clube (SP) players
Atlético Clube Goianiense players
Cuiabá Esporte Clube players
Sport Club do Recife players
Emirates Club players
Hanoi FC players
Expatriate footballers in the United Arab Emirates
Brazilian expatriate sportspeople in the United Arab Emirates
Expatriate footballers in Vietnam
Brazilian expatriate sportspeople in Vietnam